Ebo Elder (born December 23, 1978, in  Newnan, Georgia) is a former professional boxer. He is a former WBO NABO Lightweight titleholder, and has also held the IBA Continental Light Welterweight title and WBO Inter-Continental Light Welterweight title. In January 2007 he left boxing to start Reality Ministries and began speaking at churches, colleges, public schools, youth detention centers and more. Ebo's autobiography, "The Great Comeback", is available at www.eboelder.com.

Professional boxing career
Ebo began boxing at the age of two when his father bought him a punching bag. He had a long amateur career with 139 wins before turning professional in 2000, amassing 16 wins before his first loss.

After a series of wins over mid-level opponents including Emmanuel Clottey, Elder took a significant step up in class with a convincing win over undefeated contender Oscar Diaz, winning by a score of 98–92 on all three scorecards. After a tune-up bout, Elder scored a near-shutout victory over 23-7 Fernando Trejo, launching him into a WBO NABO lightweight title match.

Elder won the WBO NABO lightweight title by 6th-round TKO over 17-3 Ricardo Fuentes, then defended it in a thrilling bout with 21-2 Courtney Burton. The scorecards were close after 11 rounds, before Elder dropped Burton twice in the twelfth, winning by TKO with 50 seconds left in the round. Shobox announcer Steve Farhood said of the Elder-Burton bout, "I don't think we've ever had a more physical, grueling, brutal fight."

The win over Burton would be Elder's last. In his last fight before joining the ESPN reality show, "Contender Season 2", he lost to former title holder Lakva Sim, this time as the recipient of a 12th-round TKO.

The Contender
On the ESPN reality show The Contender 2 series debut, Elder was chosen to be on the Gold Team. In the first bout of the tourney, Ebo lost to Michael Stewart by technical knockout 1 minute 52 seconds into the 4th round.

Life after boxing
Now a born-again Christian, Elder devotes his time away from the ring as a speaker, evangelist, Bible teacher and author. He uses his boxing platform to teach, encourage and challenge his audience to God's best for their lives.  His ministry website is www.eboelder.com.

Professional boxing record

External links

Boxers from Georgia (U.S. state)
1978 births
Living people
American evangelicals
People from Newnan, Georgia
Sportspeople from the Atlanta metropolitan area
The Contender (TV series) participants
American male boxers
Welterweight boxers
Christians from Georgia (U.S. state)